The Squarcialupi Codex (Florence, Biblioteca Medicea Laurenziana, Med. Pal. 87) is an illuminated manuscript compiled in Florence in the early 15th century. It is the single largest primary source of music of the 14th-century Italian Trecento (also known as the "Italian ars nova").

It consists of 216 parchment folios, organized by composer, with each composer's section beginning with a portrait of the composer richly illuminated in gold, red, blue and purple.  The manuscript is in good condition, and musical pieces are complete. Included in the codex are 146 complete pieces by Francesco Landini, 37 by Bartolino da Padova, 36 by Niccolò da Perugia, 29 by Andrea da Firenze, 28 by Jacopo da Bologna, 17 by Lorenzo da Firenze, 16 by Gherardello da Firenze, 15 by Donato da Cascia, 12 pieces by Giovanni da Cascia, 6 by Vincenzo da Rimini, and smaller amounts of music by others.  It contains 16 blank folios, intended for the music of Paolo da Firenze, since they are labeled as such and include his portrait; the usual presumption by scholars is that Paolo's music was not ready at the time the manuscript was compiled, since he was away from Florence until 1409. There is also a section marked out for Giovanni Mazzuoli which contains no music.

The manuscript was almost certainly compiled in Florence at the monastery of Santa Maria degli Angeli, probably around 1410–1415.  Because the same unidentified family seal appears on the first folio of the manuscript and on the portrait page of Paolo da Firenze, it was long suggested that Paolo may have had some part in supervising the effort or have been part of the family that commissioned the manuscript. However, more recent evidence about the biography and in particular poor finances of Paolo has his connection to financing the manuscript unlikely.  The manuscript was owned by renowned organist Antonio Squarcialupi in the middle of the 15th century, then by his nephew, and then passed into the estate of Giuliano di Lorenzo de' Medici, who gave it to the Biblioteca Palatina in the early 16th century.  At the end of the 18th century it passed into the ownership of the Biblioteca Medicea Laurenziana.

The first folio in the codex states:  "This book is owned by Antonio di Bartolomeo Squarcialupi, organist of Santa Maria del Fiore."  On the following pages, added later, are humanistic poems in praise of Squarcialupi.

All of the compositions in the codex are secular songs in Italian:  ballata, madrigals, and cacce:  there are 353 in all, and they can be dated to the period from 1340 to 1415. Notably absent are Italian pieces by Johannes Ciconia, a northerner transplanted into Italy, and the more innovative compositions of Antonio Zachara da Teramo.

See also 
 Music of the Trecento
 Rossi Codex

Further reading 
 Kurt von Fischer, "Antonio Squarcialupi," The New Grove Dictionary of Music and Musicians, ed. Stanley Sadie.  20 vol.  London, Macmillan Publishers Ltd., 1980.  
 Kurt von Fischer/Gianluca d'Agostino, "Sources, MS, Italian Polyphony, 1325-1420", Grove Music Online ed. L. Macy (Accessed June 24, 2005), (subscription access)
 Richard H. Hoppin, Medieval Music.  New York, W.W. Norton & Co., 1978.

External links 
 La Trobe University Library Medieval Music Database

Music of the Trecento
1410s books
15th-century illuminated manuscripts
Music illuminated manuscripts
Medieval music manuscript sources
Italian music